Hercules, Samson and Ulysses, is a 1963 Italian Metrocolor peplum film directed by Pietro Francisci.

The costume designers for this movie used re-purposed Nazi helmets for the Philistine headgear.

Plot
In Ithaca, off the coast of Greece, Hercules is living a happy family life with his wife Iole and his little son at the court of Laertes, father of Ulysses. Ulysses is a youth who demonstrates athletic ability, though not Hercules' super-strength, and is already in love with a girl named Penelope. A delegation of fishermen comes to ask King Laertes to do something about a sea monster that is killing some of them. Hercules volunteers to slay the monster, Laertes provides him with a ship and crew, and Ulysses goes along with them, taking a cageful of homing pigeons at his parents' insistence, though he says they'll be back in a day and a half.

They find the sea monster and Hercules spears it, but a huge storm comes up and they must fight to survive. They cut the monster loose and it sinks to die, but the ship is wrecked and only six men, including Hercules and Ulysses, are left to float on a fragment of it. They come aground on the coast of Judea, and walk inland to the village of the Danites (Israelites of the tribe of Dan), who are occupied and tyrannized by the Philistines. The Danite hero Samson is hiding from the Philistines in the village, and observes them as the villagers advise them to get horses from a Philistine dealer and ride to Gaza, where the Philistine King may give them a ship. Samson suspects that the strangers are Philistine spies; when Ulysses sends a homing pigeon away to let his parents know where they are, he is sure of it.

On the way to Gaza, the Greeks' party is attacked by a lion, and Hercules strangles it. This makes the Philistine horse-owner think HE is Samson, and he so reports to the King or Seren of Gaza, whose seductive girlfriend, Delilah, is interested.  

A troop of Philistine soldiers enters the Danite village to look for Samson. They find a second strangled lion, so they kill the children, burn the village (nailing some villagers to their houses before setting the fires) and take the able-bodied adults away to sell as slaves. When one woman collapses on the way and a soldier goes to kill her, Samson saves her and kills all the soldiers, except one who feigns death, by throwing spears from a nearby hill. The village survivors tell him what happened at home, and he thinks the Greek strangers were behind it.

When Hercules and his companions enter the Seren's throne room, the King has them barred in and challenges Hercules to prove he is not Samson. The surviving soldier is brought in to identify him, but dies before he can say that was not the man who killed his troop. The Seren holds Ulysses and the Greek sailors hostage and gives Hercules three days to bring him Samson; if he does, the Seren will let the others go and give them a ship to sail home. Hercules finds that his guide to where Samson has been seen is Delilah, in a luxurious litter with many attendants. She tries to seduce him, but when he refuses her advances she sends all her attendants away, dresses like a poor woman and gets him to agree to a plot to lure Samson out by pretending he is dragging her off as a Danite prisoner.

This plan succeeds; Samson appears and challenges Hercules. The two super-strong men settle in for the battle which is the centerpiece of the movie, hurling boulders at each other, knocking down pillars and archways, and fighting with iron poles. But we never get to find out who would win in a battle of Hercules vs. Samson, for they soon realize they are both good guys who are for Danite freedom and against the Seren. They start talking about how to free Hercules' friends; Delilah tries to get away and warn the King, but they bring her down. She then uses her wiles on Samson to get him to let her go in aid of a plan to have Hercules pretend to bring Samson in, then trust Samson to get away after the hostages are freed and the ship has sailed.

Meanwhile, Iole and the others at home have been receiving the homing pigeons, and now know that Hercules and the others are in Judea. Laertes provides Iole with his best ship and crew to go bring them home.

Hercules and Samson approach Gaza and wait to see Ulysses and the other Greeks put onto the ship before fake-tying Samson up for the pretend delivery. But Delilah has told the Seren their plan, and appears beside him in armour as he directs hundreds of soldiers to close in on the two, while Philistine soldiers are also concealed on the ship to kill the other Greeks. Ulysses notices this and alerts the others, who fight and defeat them, then swims ashore to warn Hercules and Samson. They are on a steep hill just below the temple of Dagon, and fight off the soldiers for a while by hurling boulders down on them; they then collaborate to raise the iron beam on which the whole temple rests, bringing it down in an avalanche of stone on the whole army. They run for the ship, but the Seren's men fire flaming arrows and burn it (the other Greeks dive overboard). Iole's ship suddenly appears, and the men on board shoot a multi-spear contraption that disposes of all the remaining Philistines. The Seren wounds Ulysses from the shore, and Samson hurls a spear which kills him. Delilah is last seen sitting by his body looking not at all happy. 

On board the rescue ship, Samson hails Iole as a saviour, and Hercules mentions that her name also means "innocence" and warns Samson against Delilah. He looks a little bit thoughtful, then dives overboard to swim ashore while the Greeks happily sail away.

Cast 
 Kirk Morris: Hercules
 Iloosh Khoshabe: Samson (aka Richard Lloyd)
 Enzo Cerusico: Ulysses
 Liana Orfei:  Delilah
 Diletta D'Andrea: Leria
 Fulvia Franco:  Ithaca Queen
 Aldo Giuffrè: Seren
 Pietro Tordi: Azer

Film continuity 
Hercules, Samson and Ulysses is a sequel to the 1959 film Hercules Unchained and the 1958 film Hercules both starring Steve Reeves, the first actor to portray the mythical hero in a motion picture. Hercules, Samson and Ulysses is the third Hercules film written and directed by Pietro Francisci. Fans may easily recognize several of the supporting cast from the two previous films who served as crew members of the legendary Argo featured in the earlier films. Hercules, Samson and Ulysses also maintains a continuity in its story, including Hercules' married life, and the country Hercules lives in as Ithaca which is ruled by King Laertes. Hercules' closest companion is still Ulysses who continues using carrier birds to send messages back to Ithaca as seen in Hercules Unchained. Ulysses' portrayal is similar to that seen in the Reeves films, including dating a young woman named Penelope who worries about him during his distant adventures.

There are noticeable changes in the main casting. As Steve Reeves' career quickly took off after the success of the first Hercules film that began the sword & sandal film craze of the early and mid 1960s, Reeves was unavailable to return to the role of Hercules with his obligation to the film Sandokan the Great in 1963. Italian bodybuilder Kirk Morris was cast in the role of Hercules. The faithful sidekick of Hercules featured Italian actor Enzo Cerusico as opposed to Gabriele Antonini who played the supporting role of Ulysses in both Reeves films. Italian actor Andrea Fantasia maintained his role as King Laertes of Ithaca from the Reeves films. Actress/model Sylva Koscina was unavailable in 1963, and the role of Hercules' wife Iole, was portrayed by actress Diletta D'Andrea. The third film also suggests a time lapse in which Hercules and Iole have a young boy.

Crossover
The film sets Hercules' adventure in Judea, a land largely referred to in biblical accounts. There are vague biblical references including the film's second strongman Samson also referred to as Samson, the Danite, an enemy and fugitive of the Philistines. The film's subplot centers around the established fact that the fugitive Samson possesses God-given strength to kill wild animals–specifically lions with his bare hands. When Hercules arrives in Judea and displays similar strength to slay a lion with his bare hands, he is mistaken by the Philistine king Seren for Samson as he heard prophecy foretell his death by Samson's hands. 

The film also features a femme fatale named Delilah, mistress of the Philistine king Seren. The film selectively chooses elements from the biblical account of Delilah and portrays her as a cunning seductress who first meets and persuades Hercules to capture Samson in exchange for the lives of his friends held prisoner by King Seren. After her plan fails she is shown mercy by Samson, who is charmed by her beauty and agrees to let her return to King Seren. Hercules realizes Samson has fallen in love with Delilah and cautions him against her skillful deception. Delilah reneges on her promise to help Hercules and Samson escape the Philistines. She betrays the two heroes and sets a trap with the Philistine king. Hercules and Samson overcome the trap laid for them and the king is killed in battle by Samson. Towards the film's end there is a vague reference made to the biblical account of Samson and Delilah when Hercules warns Samson once more to beware of any further deception by Delilah.

Not only the crossover but this and the previous movies' pairing of Hercules and Ulysses (more properly Odysseus) are hilariously impossible in actual history. Whether the three title characters are real people or mythological, Hercules would have been associated with a generation around 1293 B.C., Ulysses would have lived around 1230 B.C., and Samson would have lived around 1100 B.C.

Release
Hercules, Samson and Ulysses opened on December 20, 1963 in Italy. It was released in May 1965 in the United States.

References

External links
 
 
 

1963 films
Films about Heracles
Films directed by Pietro Francisci
Metro-Goldwyn-Mayer films
Peplum films
Films scored by Angelo Francesco Lavagnino
Sword and sandal films
1960s Italian films